Teh Min Jie (born 12 May 1996) is a Malaysian female squash player who is also a current member of the Malaysian squash team. She is currently coached by Ong Beng Hee, a former Malaysian professional squash player.

Teh Min Jie broke into the world's top 100 female squash players list in 2014 and achieved her career best ranking of 55 in March 2017 during the 2017 PSA World Tour. She earned a Wildcard (sports) entry to the Women's China Squash Open 2015 where she lost in three games to England's Emma Beddoes. Teh Min Jie was also the member of the Malaysian squash team which emerged as the champions in the Asian Squash Team Championships in 2016.

In 2017 Teh Min Jie enrolled at Trinity College (Connecticut) and has played in the top three slots on the women's squash team. She was named as one of ten collegiate All-Americans by the College Squash Association.

References 

1996 births
Living people
Malaysian female squash players
People from Selangor
Southeast Asian Games medalists in squash
Southeast Asian Games gold medalists for Malaysia
Competitors at the 2015 Southeast Asian Games
21st-century Malaysian women